Freaks (released with the subtitle Ten Stories About Power, Claustrophobia, Suffocation and Holding Hands) is the second studio album by English rock band Pulp, released on 11 May 1987 by Fire Records.

Release and aftermath

Freaks was released in 1987 to little commercial success and features a much darker sound than its predecessor, It. Russell Senior sings lead vocals on "Fairground" and "Anorexic Beauty". "Master of the Universe" was released as a single in an alternative version called the "sanitised version"; it replaces the word "masturbates" with "vegetates".

"I Want You" is the only song from the album to have been performed live regularly, most notably during the UK Forest Tour in the Summer of 2002.

The album was reissued and remastered by Fire Records in 2012 along with 1983's It and 1992's Separations. This re-release took several delays as the first stated release date was 8 August 2011 while the albums finally came out on 13 February 2012. An announcement in the interim stated that the albums would be remastered with new bonus tracks to be added to the track listings as well as new artwork and liner notes from music journalist Everett True.

The reissue bonus disc is in fact Masters of the Universe compilation aside from two tracks: "They Suffocate at Night" which appears on the album itself and "Master of the Universe (sanitised version)" which again appears on the album without censorship.

Track listing

Personnel
Pulp
Jarvis Cocker – lead vocals, guitar, drums on "Anorexic Beauty"
Russell Senior – violin, guitar, lead vocals on "Fairground" and "Anorexic Beauty"
Candida Doyle – organ, piano, backing vocals on "There's No Emotion"
Peter Mansell – bass, guitar on "Life Must Be So Wonderful"
Magnus Doyle – drums, percussion, guitar on "Anorexic Beauty"

Additional personnel
 Jonathon Kirk – mixing assistance
 Graeme Durham – mastering
 The Robert Winterman Design Group – sleeve design

References

Truth and Beauty: The Story of Pulp by Mark Sturdy (Omnibus Press)
AcrylicAfternoons

External links

Freaks at YouTube (streamed copy where licensed)
 

1987 albums
Pulp (band) albums
Fire Records (UK) albums